Ajmel Quereshi is a Magistrate Judge of the United States District Court for the District of Maryland.

Early life and education
Quereshi is the son of two Pakistani-American immigrants. He received a Bachelor of Arts in Sociology, English, and History from Marquette University, cum laude.  He received his Juris Doctor, magna cum laude, from the University of Minnesota Law School in 2007.

Career
After law school, Quereshi clerked for Damon Keith of the United States Court of Appeals for the Sixth Circuit and James G. Carr of the United States District Court for the Northern District of Ohio.  In between his clerkships, he served as a Skadden Fellow at the ACLU of Maryland, also serving on the ACLU of Maryland's board of directors. Quereshi accepted a position as Visiting Assistant Professor and Director of the Civil Rights Clinic at Howard University School of Law. Quereshi served as staff counsel at the ACLU's National Prison Project. In 2015, Mr. Quereshi joined the NAACP Legal Defense and Educational Fund, where he served as Senior Counsel. Quereshi was selected as a Magistrate Judge of the United States District Court for the District of Maryland and took the oath of office during an informal ceremony on April 18, 2022.

Notable cases
In 2018, Quereshi was lead counsel in multiple suits against HUD. The suits alleged HUD suspended housing regulations that made housing more accessible and affordable. In Open Communities Alliance v. Carson, a preliminary injunction was obtained, pausing the Trump Administration from suspending the regulation.   

Also in 2018, Quereshi was part of the legal team in a class-action lawsuit filed by The ACLU of Michigan, the NAACP Legal Defense and Educational Fund, and lawyers from Covington & Burling LLP. The suit, Morningside v. Sabree alleged discriminatory tax foreclosures and was filed against the Wayne County Treasurer, Wayne County, Michigan and the City of Detroit. 

In 2019, Quereshi led a legal team that represented plaintiffs in Bradford v. Maryland State Board of Education. The ACLU and the NAACP Legal Defense and Educational Fund filed a lawsuit on behalf of students attending public schools in Baltimore who claimed they were denied a constitutionally adequate education.

Personal life
Quereshi, who is a Muslim, meet his wife Jill E. Rauh, a devout Catholic, through a student group devoted to justice issues. In 2021, Quereshi and his wife Jill Rauh were awarded the Spirit of Marquette Award at Marquette University.

References

Marquette University alumni
University of Minnesota Law School alumni
Year of birth missing (living people)
Living people